Erin Tobin is an American politician and nurse practitioner serving as a member of the South Dakota Senate. Elected in November 2020, she assumed office on January 12, 2021 representing the 21st district of South Dakota.

Education 
After graduating from Colome High School in Colome, South Dakota, Tobin earned a Bachelor of Science and Master of Science in nursing from South Dakota State University.

Career 
Tobin became involved in politics during a lobbying effort to introduce a bill in the South Dakota Legislature that would allow the state's nurses to have full practice authority. Tobin later lobbied against legislation when her predecessor, then-State House Majority Leader Lee Qualm, introduced a bill that would remove vaccination requirements for South Dakota students. In 2020, Tobin ran against Qualm in the Republican primary for a seat in the South Dakota Senate, defeating him by 22.4% of votes cast. Tobin then defeated Democratic nominee Dan Kerner Andersson in the November general election and assumed office on January 12, 2021.

Personal life 
Tobin and her ex-husband, Travis, have two children. She lives in Winner, South Dakota.

References 

Living people
South Dakota State University alumni
Republican Party South Dakota state senators
Women state legislators in South Dakota
People from Tripp County, South Dakota
Year of birth missing (living people)
21st-century American women